Chauchina is a municipality in the province of Granada, in Spain.

References

Municipalities in the Province of Granada